is a Japanese animated television series based on the novel Daddy-Long-Legs by Jean Webster. 

This anime was aired in 1990 and part of the container World Masterpiece Theater produced by Nippon Animation studios and was awarded the Excellent Movie Award for Television by the Japanese Agency of Cultural Affairs for Children in 1990. 40 episodes were produced.

Premise
Judy Abbott is an orphan who has been given the opportunity to study at the prestigious Lincoln Memorial High School by a mysterious benefactor whom she only knows as "John Smith". She has only seen his shadow once, and because of his long legs, she calls him "Daddy Long Legs". The only payment she is to give her benefactor is that she write him letters every month, with no expectation of them being responded to.

The anime covers three years of Judy's life, starting with her leaving the John Grier Home orphanage, and ending with her finishing high school.

Characters

A cheerful and intelligent girl whose parents died when she was still a baby. She was found at Bayson Avenue at New York City and was taken into the John Grier Home, where she develops her talent for writing. It is one of her essays that catches the attention of a trustee known as "John Smith", enabling her to earn a scholarship from him to attend the Lincoln Memorial High School. She does not know who John Smith is, and calls him "Daddy Long Legs". Even so, she considers him the only family she has, and becomes attached to him. She talks very much and loves story telling. Judy's roommates at Lincoln Memorial are Sallie McBride and Julia Pendleton. Judy has a considerable inferiority complex that she is orphan, she suffers not to be able to confide it to anyone. In the anime, Judy's appearance seems to resemble like Pippi Longstocking, by having red-hair and braids sticking out.

A shy but sweet girl who is one of Judy's roommates at the Lincoln Memorial High School. They become very close, and Sallie grows very fond of Judy. She is often made fun of by Julia because of her short and chubby stature. She is strong-willed in spite of her appearance.

A wealthy and snobbish, but well-mannered student, she is very tall and elegant and one of Judy's roommates at the Lincoln Memorial High School. She and Judy initially do not get along, with Julia constantly trying to uncover Judy's secret background. However, she eventually becomes Judy's best friend along with Sally.

The manager of the dormitory where Judy lives in Fergussen Hall, who tends to put up a mask of cruelty and anger to hide what she truly feels. She hates that she is called "Mrs." because she is still a bachelor. However, she seems to want to marry.

Julia Pendleton's uncle, whom Judy meets over her time at the Lincoln Memorial school. He is called an eccentric misanthropist and is famous in business world, however the reason is because he hates polite society. He later develops feelings for Judy. He, later in the series, admits to Judy that he was her 'Daddy Long Legs' all along. At the end of the series, he and Judy are married.

Secretary of Judy's sponsor, "Daddy Long-Legs".

Sallie's elder brother, he is the highly popular ace of the Princeton University football team. He is very kind and an obliging person. He grows fond of Judy. Julia falls in love with him in her second year.

Captain of Princeton University football team, a gentleman, albeit unreliable at times.

Judy's new roommate. She is 1 year old older than Judy. She returned to Judy's class after having taken a leave of absence from school because of chest's disease for one year. She is good at poetry and sports, she was a famous player of basketball before. Judy disliked her because she criticized a novel which Judy wrote. However, she becomes a good senior of Judy immediately.

John Greer Orphanage's Director. Children in Orphanage hated her because she was too strict to the discipline. However, she loves children in reality. She retires while Judy is attending Lincoln Memorial High School.

St. George Orphanage's Staff. She is a strong woman with humor and acting power, is adored by children. She has a very realistic idea for the education of the orphan. She is a prototype of Maria Florence in next series Trapp Family Story.

Original voice cast
Mitsuko Horie as Judy Abbott
Chie Satou as Sally McBride
Yuri Amano as Julia Pendleton
Hideyuki Tanaka as Jervis Pendleton
Bin Shimada as Jimmy McBride
Yoshino Ohtori as Ms. Throne
Tatsuko Ishimori as Harmond
Hiromi Tsuru as Leonora Fenton (episode 20–22 & 40)
Hiroshi Masuoka as Mr. Griggs
Kenichi Ogata as George Sempleton
Hisako Kyouda as Eliza Sempleton
Michitaka Kobayashi as Arthur
Yuko Kobayashi as Carrie
Toshiko Fujita as Mrs. Lippett and Margot Foster
Masako Katsuki as Mary Lambart
Yoku Shioya as Bob
Yuriko Fuchizaki as Emily
Eiko Yamada as Sadie

Staff
 Director : Kazuyoshi Yokota
 Scenario : Hiroshi Ōtsuka, Nobuyuki Fujimoto
 Character design : Shūichi Seki
 Music : Kei Wakakusa
 Sound director : Tadayoshi Fujino
 Animation director : Atsushi Irie, Akira Kikuchi
 Art director : Shigero Morimoto
 Producer : Takaji Matsudo (Nippon Animation), Yoshihisa Tachikawa (Fuji Television)
 Planning : Shōji Satō (Nippon Animation), Masunosuke Ōhashi (Dentsu Osaka branch), Kenji Shimizu (Fuji Television)
 Production management : Mitsuru Takakuwa, Junzō Nakajima (Nippon Animation)
 Production desk : Akio Yogo

Episode list

Music

References

External links
 
 Nippon Animation – the outline of "My Daddy Long Legs" (Japanese)

See also
 The Story of Pollyanna, Girl of Love : Same as this work, Mitsuko Horie acted an orphan who is the main character.
 Jeanie with the Light Brown Hair (TV series) : Same as this work, starring Mitsuko Horie, planned by Masunosuke Ōhashi. Broadcast in 1992.

1990 anime television series debuts
Animated television series about orphans
Drama anime and manga
Romance anime and manga
Television shows set in New York City
World Masterpiece Theater series
Fuji TV original programming